The 1973 World Women's Handball Championship took place in Yugoslavia between 7-15 December 1973.

Preliminary round

Group A

Group B

Group C

Group D

Main round

Group E

Group F

Group G

Placement round

Seventh Place playoff

Fifth Place Playoff

Third Place playoff

Final

Final standings

References

Source: International Handball Federation

World Handball Championship tournaments
W
W
W
Women's handball in Yugoslavia
World Women's Handball Championship
December 1973 sports events in Europe